Sasha Putrya (December 2, 1977 – January 24, 1989) was a Ukrainian artist who became notable through painting thousands of artworks, before dying at the age of 11 from leukemia.

Biography 
Sasha (Oleksandra) Putrya was born 
on 2 December 1977 and lived in the region of Poltava, Ukrainian SSR. Having started painting at the age of 3, by the time of her death at age 11, she had created around 2,279 paintings and drawings, many of which are collected within 46 albums and are on display in a museum in Poltava, Ukraine.

She had an intense interest in India, though she had never been there—she loved the country, its music, clothes, and customs, and even dreamed of marrying the Indian film actor Mithun Chakraborty. Sasha Putrya died on 24 January 1989 of leukemia. She was buried, dressed in Indian saris with a small photo of Mithun Chakraborty, her lifetime talisman.

Notes and references

External links 
 http://www.lovemity.narod.ru/risunki.html Some images of her artwork
 Article about her work and awards
 Sasha Putrya's museum

1977 births
1989 deaths
Artists from Poltava
Deaths from leukemia
Deaths from cancer in the Soviet Union
20th-century Ukrainian women artists
20th-century Ukrainian painters